Kitl or KITL may refer to:

 Kernel Independent Transport Layer
 Kittel, a Jewish ritual garment
 Stem cell factor, or KIT ligand
 KZTN-LD, a low-power television station (channel 20) licensed to serve Boise, Idaho, United States, which held the call sign KITL-LP or KITL-LD from 2002 to 2013

See also
Kjetil, a Norwegian masculine name